Victor H. Fusia (November 13, 1913 – January 18, 1991) was an American football player and coach.  He served as the head coach at the University of Massachusetts Amherst from 1961 to 1970. He compiled a 59–32–2 overall record and won five Yankee Conference championships.

Born in Wilkinsburg, Pennsylvania, Fusia was a 1938 graduate of Manhattan College and a Navy veteran of World War II. He coached five years in the Pennsylvania high school system in the 1950s and was an assistant coach at Brown and the Pittsburgh before becoming the head coach at Massachusetts. He resigned after the 1970 season to become the school's staff associate in charge of sports promotion. He remained with the school until his retirement in 1982. Fusia died of a heart attack on January 18, 1991.

Head coaching record

College

References

External links
 

1913 births
1991 deaths
American football halfbacks
Brown Bears football coaches
Jacksonville Naval Air Station Flyers football players
Manhattan Jaspers football players
Pittsburgh Panthers football coaches
UMass Minutemen football coaches
High school football coaches in Pennsylvania
United States Navy personnel of World War II
Sportspeople from Amherst, Massachusetts
People from Wilkinsburg, Pennsylvania
Coaches of American football from Pennsylvania
Players of American football from Pennsylvania